Integrity Watch Afghanistan (IWA) is an Afghan non-governmental organization that works to increase transparency (social), integrity and accountability in Afghanistan through the provision of policy-oriented research, monitoring, capacity building and advocacy on political corruption and aid effectiveness.

History 
IWA was created in October 2005 and developed a National Corruption Survey which measures Afghans' perspective on petty corruption. Prior to 2010 the Corruption Survey included only a few of the 34 provinces and was not able to give a national overview of the corruption situation in Afghanistan. In the 2010 National Corruption Survey, 32 out of the 34 provinces of Afghanistan were covered but the survey still faces some limitations as it was unable to survey areas that are in conflict and under pure Taliban control.

IWA's research measures the evolution of corruption trends and habits in Afghanistan and produces training tools to raise awareness about corruption. The organisation also works to strengthen local capacities to prevent corruption within the Afghan public institutions, private sector, civil society organisations and the public at large. IWA has three programmatic pillars: Community Based Monitoring, Public Service Monitoring and Extractive Industries Monitoring.

IWA has partnered with numerous like minded Afghan and international organisations since its inception, solidifying its position as the premiere anti-corruption civil society organisation in Afghanistan while also furthering its mission in support of transparency and accountability for Afghans and gaining recognition as an Afghan non-governmental organisation (NGO) watch dog by the United Nations.

References 

 Al Jazeera Study says Afghan graft worsening
 BBC Afghan Corruption has doubled since 2007
 CMI Afghan hydrocarbon: Addressing corruption to fuel development?
 Eurasianet Extracting Change in Afghanistan's Development Quagmire
 France 24 - Kabul Bank - Where business and political ties bind
 International Peace Bureau Military intervention, aid and governance in Afghanistan
 Journal of Democracy A New Approach to Postwar Reconstruction
 Network for Integrity in Reconstruction Corruption, Effectiveness and Accountability in Post-War Countries
 OECD Working towards a common donor response to corruption
 Overseas Development Institute  Corruption perceptions and risks in humanitarian assistance: an Afghanistan case study
 The Washington Post Survey of Afghans points to rampant corruption in government
 The Washington Times Afghans say official corruption helps Taliban
 Transparency International UK  Building integrity and reducing corruption in defence & security: 20 practical reforms
 U4 Fighting Corruption in Afghanistan: A roadmap for strategy and action

External links 

 Integrity Watch Afghanistan Reports on corruption in Afghanistan and Community Based Monitoring
 Afghan Conflict Monitoring  Reports on Corruption in Afghanistan
 IBP Open Budget Index
 Tiri Accountability on Reconstruction Projects
 U4 Resources on Anti-Corruption

Politics of Afghanistan
Non-profit organisations based in Afghanistan
Transparency (behavior)
Anti-corruption non-governmental organizations
Corruption in Afghanistan